Palkino is a rural locality (a village) in Lipovskoye Rural Settlement of Velsky District, Arkhangelsk Oblast, Russia. The population was 25 as of 2014. There are 3 streets.

Geography 
Palkino is located 111 km northwest of Velsk (the district's administrative centre) by road. Tuymino is the nearest rural locality.

References 

Rural localities in Velsky District